Liturgy of St John Chrysostom, Op. 31, is a 1910 musical work by Sergei Rachmaninoff, one of his two major unaccompanied choral works (the other being his All-Night Vigil).  The Divine Liturgy of St. John Chrysostom is the primary worship service of the Eastern Orthodox Church.

History 
Rachmaninoff composed the work in July, 1910 at his summer estate Ivanovka, following his American tour of 1909.  Writing to his friend Nikita Morozov, Rachmaninoff said of the work, "I have been thinking about the Liturgy for a long time and for a long time I strove to write it.  I started to work on it somehow by chance and then suddenly became fascinated with it.  And then I finished it very quickly.  Not for a long time have I written anything with such pleasure."

The work premiered November 25, 1910 in Moscow.  Russian Orthodox ecclesiastical authorities strongly objected to the work's "spirit of modernism" and refused to sanction it for use during church services.  Rachmaninoff did nothing to promote the work himself, and it soon fell into obscurity.

A portion of the Liturgy was given in concert performance in New York on January 24, 1914, by the male choir of the Russian Cathedral of St. Nicholas, conducted by Ivan Gorokhov.

A new edition, reconstructed from surviving part books at an Orthodox monastery in the U.S. and microfilm at the U.S. Library of Congress, was published by Anthony Antolini in 1988.  This reconstruction was the subject of a PBS documentary entitled "Rediscovering Rachmaninoff", produced by KTEH television in San Jose, California.

Movements 
The Liturgy consists of twenty movements for unaccompanied mixed choir.  Three contain solo passages: Movement 2 (Blagoslovi, dushe moia, Ghospoda/Bless the Lord, O my soul) for alto, Movement 10 (Veruiu/The Nicene Creed) for Bass, and Movement 12 (Tebie poiem/To Thee we sing), for treble or soprano.  Two (Movements 14 and 19) are scored for double choir.

The twenty movements are these:

Recordings

See also 
 Liturgy of St. John Chrysostom (Tchaikovsky)
 Liturgy of St. John Chrysostom (Leontovych)
 Divine Liturgy - Main Wikipedia article on the Liturgy of St. John Chrysostom

References

External links

Compositions by Sergei Rachmaninoff
Choral compositions
1910 compositions
Eastern Orthodox liturgical music
John Chrysostom